This is a list of television dramas released by TVB in 2010.

Top ten drama series in ratings
The following is a list of TVB's top serial dramas in 2010 by average ratings. The list includes premiere week and final week ratings, as well as the average overall count of live Hong Kong viewers (in millions).

Awards

First line series
These dramas air in Hong Kong from 8:00pm to 8:30pm, Monday to Friday on Jade.

Second line series
These dramas air in Hong Kong from 8:30pm to 9:30pm, Monday to Friday on Jade.

Third line series
These dramas air in Hong Kong from 9:30pm to 10:30pm, Monday to Friday on Jade.

Warehoused series
These dramas were released overseas and have not broadcast on the TVB Jade Channel.

References

External links
  TVB.com

2010
2010 in Hong Kong television